Datuk Anthony L. Lamb M.A., Dip. Ag., D.T.A., P.G.D.K. (born 1 June 1942) is a British botanist, born in British Ceylon and specializing in the flora of Sabah, East Malaysia, on the northwest portion of the island of Borneo.  Lamb was educated in the United Kingdom, at Blundell's School in Tiverton and at St John's College at Cambridge. Lamb arrived in Sabah, then part of the British Crown Colony of North Borneo, in 1962 and started work on developing agricultural settlement schemes around Tawau.

In 1981, Lamb set up the Tenom Orchid Centre as a Sabah State Government conservation project. He is co-author of Rhododendrons of Sabah (1988) and Pitcher-Plants of Borneo (1996), and a coordinator and a co-author of the Orchids of Borneo series.

In 2015, Lamb was awarded a P.G.D.K. (Panglima Gemilang Darjah Kinabalu, in English: Commander of the Order of Kinabalu) by the Governor of Sabah, which carries the title of Datuk.

Lamb is married to Datin Anthea Phillipps, and has two children.

Lamb has authored several volumes relating to the native orchids of Kinabalu Park, in Sabah, and Lamb described his life's work in an extensive 2004 interview, The Lost World of Sabah,  in The Daily Telegraph.

A species of the orchid genus Dendrobium, found in Sabah and described in 2016, has been named Dendrobium Lambii in his honour. The New Zealand Native Group has recognized the work he has done over the years in 2016 for the Orchids of Borneo.

References

1942 births
Living people
People from Sabah
Sri Lankan emigrants to the United Kingdom
People educated at Blundell's School
Alumni of St John's College, Cambridge
British botanists